The Kildin-class destroyer was a series of destroyers built for the Soviet Navy in the 1950s. Four ships were built around the KSShch (КСЩ, SS-N-1) anti-ship missile. When this missile became obsolete in the 1960s, three ships were modernised in 1972-1977. All ships were decommissioned in the late 1980s early 1990s. The Soviet designation was Project 56EM for the prototype (Bedovy), Project 56M for three series ships, and Project 56U for the modernised ships.

Design

The Kotlin-class hull and machinery were retained, A rail SSM launcher was fitted at the stern and the forward 130mm gun was replaced by two quad 57mm anti aircraft guns (45mm in Bedovy). The torpedo tubes were replaced by twin 533mm tubes located on the beam. After the SS-N-1 missile was declared to be obsolete the Soviets replaced these missiles with two 76mm gun turrets aft and four SS-N-2 missile launchers.

Ships 
 Bedovy (Бедовый - Mischievous) - built by Zhdanov Shipyard, Leningrad, completed 1958, scrapped 1989
 Neulovimy (Неуловимый - Elusive) - built by Zhdanov Shipyard, Leningrad, completed 1958, scrapped 1990
 Prozorlivy (Прозорливый - Perceptive ) - built in Nikolayev, completed 1958, scrapped 1991
 Neuderzhimy (Неудержимый - Unrestrainable) - built in Komsomolsk na Amure, completed 1958, scrapped 1985 (not modernised)
Neukrotimy (Неукротимый - Indomitable) - cancelled before construction starts

See also
List of ships of the Soviet Navy
List of ships of Russia by project number

References
 
 All Russian Kildin Class Destroyers - Complete Ship List

Destroyer classes